SA Weekender is a travel, culture and lifestyle show featuring destinations throughout South Australia. The series first screened in 2017, replacing a similar series called SA Life and airs on Sundays at 5:30pm on the Seven Network in South Australia.

The program visits a range locations in South Australia and looks at accommodation, dining and entertainment. In November 2019, the Seven Network announced the show had been axed with final episodes screening in 2020. However it since returned for a range of special episodes from February to September 2020 screening locally and nationally across the Seven Network.

SA Weekender has since returned for a full 2021 series exploring the best attractions, experiences and destinations across South Australia. All episodes are available to stream anytime on 7plus.

Presenters
 Belinda Sloane
 Callum Hann
 Kelly Golding
 Briony Hume
 Andrew Hayes
 Ron Kandelaars
 Teresa Palmer
 Accordion Hans

See also
 Sydney Weekender
 Melbourne Weekender
 Queensland Weekender
 WA Weekender

External links 
 Official website

References

Seven Network original programming
Australian non-fiction television series
Australian travel television series
Television shows set in South Australia
2017 Australian television series debuts